Alexander Vladimirovich "Sasha" Artemev (born August 29, 1985) is a retired American artistic gymnast. Artemev was a member of the bronze medal-winning U.S. team at the 2008 Olympic Games. He is the 2006 all-around U.S. national champion. Known for his ability on pommel horse, he is the 2007 and 2008 U.S. national champion on the pommel horse and won the bronze medal on the event at the 2006 World Championships.

Personal life
Alexander Artemev, who goes by the Russian diminutive "Sasha", was born August 29, 1985, in Minsk, Belarusian SSR, Soviet Union. He is the only child of Svetlana and Vladimir Artemev. Both his parents are gymnastics coaches and former competitive gymnasts for the Soviet Union. His mother competed in rhythmic gymnastics while his father competed in artistic gymnastics. Vladimir was the 1982 USSR Cup all-around champion, whose own Olympic ambitions were dashed by the Soviet boycott of the 1984 Summer Olympics. By 1990, Svetlana moved to Chile to coach, leaving Vladimir a single dad.

Father and son came to the United States in 1994, becoming U.S. citizens in December 2002. Artemev attended McLain High School, graduating in 2003. He married University of Denver gymnast Brianna Springer in the summer of 2009, but the couple divorced in 2011.

Gymnastics career
Artemev won three titles at the 2006 U.S. National Championships in the all-around, pommel horse and parallel bars. He was the only member of the American men's team to win a medal at the 2006 World Championships, taking the bronze on the pommel horse. He became the first U.S. gymnast since Kurt Thomas in 1979 to win a world championship medal on pommel horse. At the 2007 U.S. Nationals he finished fourth in the all around, behind champion David Durante, Guillermo Alvarez, and Sho Nakamori. At the competition he became the first gymnast to land a triple-twisting Yurchenko vault.

At the 2008 U.S. Nationals, Artemev won the pommel horse title for the second consecutive year. After the U.S. Olympic Trials in June, he was named as an alternate to the men's team for the 2008 Olympics. On August 7, he was added to the team, replacing injured Morgan Hamm.

Together with his teammates, Artemev won the bronze medal in men's team gymnastics in Beijing. Artemev's dazzling performance on the pommel horse, the last routine for the team, clinched the bronze medal for the U.S. team. Following the team competition, Artemev competed in the individual all-around, where he received the second highest pommel horse score with a 15.525. Artemev finished the all-around competition in 12th place behind fellow American Jonathan Horton, who placed ninth. Artemev qualified for the pommel horse individual finals in sixth position. He attempted a new routine that would raise his difficulty level. However, halfway through his routine, and just after completing a more difficult move, he fell on an easier move, resulting in an automatic 0.8 of a point deduction, which dropped his final score to a 14.975 for seventh place.

In April 2009, Artemev injured two vertebrae in a car accident, but continued training to try to make the team for the 2009 World Championships. The injury forced him out of the 2009 U.S. National Championships in August, but USA Gymnastics still named him to the world team on the condition he could prove physical readiness prior to competition. However, he was unable to sufficiently recover to attend the verification camp.

Artemev returned competition in February 2010, competing four events in qualification at the U.S. Winter Cup. At the end of 2010, he said he hoped to compete all six events again the next season. In February 2011, he competed three events at the U.S. Winter Cup, but did not advance to the second day's finals.

Artemev did not compete again for the rest of the Olympic cycle. In 2012, he said he would decide after the London Olympic Games whether or not to make a comeback for the 2016 Olympics, but he eventually retired.

He currently coaches, alongside his father, at 5280 Gymnastics in Colorado. One of their top gymnasts, Yul Moldauer, is the 2014 U.S. junior national champion on pommel horse, 2017 national champion, and 2020 Olympic team member.

References

External links
 Alexander Artemev at USA Gymnastics
 Alexander Artemev at the United States Olympic Committee

1985 births
Living people
Gymnasts from Minsk
American male artistic gymnasts
Belarusian emigrants to the United States
Sportspeople from Colorado
People from Lakewood, Colorado
Medalists at the World Artistic Gymnastics Championships
Gymnasts at the 2008 Summer Olympics
Olympic bronze medalists for the United States in gymnastics
Medalists at the 2008 Summer Olympics
Sportspeople from the Denver metropolitan area
People from Highlands Ranch, Colorado
Pan American Games medalists in gymnastics
Pan American Games bronze medalists for the United States
Gymnasts at the 2003 Pan American Games